Gry is a unisex given name used primarily in Scandinavia, equivalent to the English Dawn.
 Gry Mølleskog (born 1962), the Lord Chamberlain of the Royal Court of Norway. The first female Lord Chamberlain in the world.
 Gry Larsen (born 1975), Norwegian politician for the Labour Party
 Gry Østvik, former Norwegian biathlete and the first overall world cup winner for women
 Gry Forssell (born 1973), Swedish television host and radio talk-show host
 Gry Blekastad Almås (born 1970), Norwegian journalist
 Gry Bay (born 1974), Danish actress and singer
 Gry Bagøien, female singer from Denmark
 Gry Johansen (born 1964), Danish singer who represented her country in Eurovision Song Contest 1983